is a railway station on the Kagoshima Main Line operated by JR Kyushu located in Onga, Fukuoka Prefecture, Japan.

Lines

Layout
The station consists of a side platform and an island platform serving three tracks. Track 1 is served by the platform 1, the side platform. A passing loop runs next to it and is designated track 2. Tracks 3 and 4 are served by platforms 2 and 3 (the island platform). Numerous sidings run to the south of track 4.

Adjacent stations

History
When the Kyushu Railway was nationalized on 1 July 1907, Japanese Government Railways (JGR) took over control of the station. On 12 October 1909, the station became part of the Hitoyoshi Main Line and then on 21 November 1909, part of the Kagoshima Main Line. With the privatization of Japanese National Railways (JNR), the successor of JGR, on 1 April 1987, JR Kyushu took over control of the station.

See also 
List of railway stations in Japan

References

External links
Ongagawa Station (JR Kyushu)

Railway stations in Fukuoka Prefecture
Railway stations in Japan opened in 1890